Melissa Mata (born 25 March 1980) is a Costa Rican swimmer. She competed in the women's 200 metre butterfly event at the 1996 Summer Olympics.

References

External links
 

1980 births
Living people
Costa Rican female swimmers
Olympic swimmers of Costa Rica
Swimmers at the 1996 Summer Olympics
Place of birth missing (living people)
Central American and Caribbean Games gold medalists for Costa Rica
Central American and Caribbean Games medalists in swimming
Competitors at the 1998 Central American and Caribbean Games
20th-century Costa Rican women
21st-century Costa Rican women